Eric Paxton (born 4 April 1957) is a former Scotland national team international rugby union player.

Rugby Union career

Amateur career

Paxton played for Kelso. He played for them in two championship winning sides.

He captained the Co-Optimists in 1986 when they played in the Hong Kong Sevens.

Provincial career

He played for South of Scotland District in the Scottish Inter-District Championship.

International career

He was capped by Scotland 'B' twice, the first time on 7 March 1981 against France 'B'. Scotland 'B' won the match 18-4. M

He was capped twice by the full senior Scotland side, both times in 1982. He played against Ireland at Lansdowne Rd, and Australia at the Sydney Cricket ground.

Coaching career

He was the head coach of the Border Reivers when the Scottish game turned professional in 1996.

He took over as head coach of Biggar in 1997.

References

1957 births
Living people
Scotland 'B' international rugby union players
Scotland international rugby union players
Scottish rugby union players
Co-Optimist Rugby Club players
Kelso RFC players
South of Scotland District (rugby union) players